Joshua Zimmerman may refer to:

 Joshua D. Zimmerman (born 1966), professor of history at Yeshiva University
 Joshua Soule Zimmerman (1874–1962), American lawyer, politician and orchardist